1888–1889 marked the third season of the club that was to become Arsenal F.C. After the flooding of the Sportsman's Ground, they moved to the nearby Manor Field, using the Lord Derby Pub as a headquarters, and the Railway Tavern as a dressing room. The team competed in the Kent Senior Cup (KSC) for the first time, as well as making their second appearance in the London Senior Cup, reaching the semi-finals of the latter competition. David Danskin continued as captain throughout the season.

Players 
Below is a list of all players who made a registered appearance in the 1888–89 season, along with their appearances, and goals scored. Out of 33 games played, 20 complete line-ups were recorded, with partial records for another 8. Bold indicates that a player was making his debut for Royal Arsenal F.C. that season. Goalkeepers are marked in Italics.

Matches 
A total of 34 games were played over the season, of which 7 were competitive cup fixtures, with the other 26 being friendlies. Over the course of the season, the Royal Arsenal  recorded 17 Wins, 6 Draws and 10 losses, with 1 result unrecorded.

References

Arsenal F.C. seasons
Arsenal